Guarianthe patinii is a species of orchid. It is native to Costa Rica, Panama, Colombia, Venezuela, and Trinidad; it is also reportedly naturalized in Ecuador.

References

External links

patinii
Orchids of Central America
Orchids of South America
Flora of Trinidad and Tobago
Plants described in 1900
Flora without expected TNC conservation status